Lukáš Zelenický (born 10 April 1990) is a Slovak football midfielder who currently plays for SVg Pitten.

External links
FC Nitra profile 

1990 births
Living people
Slovak footballers
Slovak expatriate footballers
Association football fullbacks
FC Nitra players
PFK Piešťany players
ŠK 1923 Gabčíkovo players
Slovak Super Liga players
FC Baník Prievidza players
Slovak expatriate sportspeople in Austria
Expatriate footballers in Austria

Association football midfielders